Anna Lebedeva (born in Shchuchinsk on ) is a Kazakh biathlete.

Lebedeva competed in the 2006 and 2010 Winter Olympics for Kazakhstan. Her best performance was 14th as part of the 2010 Kazakh relay team. Her best individual finish was 38th, in the 2010 individual. In 2006, she finished 52nd in the sprint, was lapped in the pursuit and placed 49th in the individual. In 2010, she also placed 52nd in the sprint and 44th in the pursuit.

As of February 2013, her best performance at the Biathlon World Championships is 11th, as part of the 2010 Kazakh mixed relay team. Her best individual performance is 27th, in the 2009 sprint.

As of February 2013, Lebedeva's best Biathlon World Cup result is 7th, as part of the Kazakh women's relay team in Antholz during the 2010/11 season. Her best individual performance is 19th, in the pursuit at Antholz in 2009/10. Her best overall finish in the Biathlon World Cup is 58th, in 2005/06.

References 

1981 births
Biathletes at the 2006 Winter Olympics
Biathletes at the 2010 Winter Olympics
Kazakhstani female biathletes
Living people
Olympic biathletes of Kazakhstan
People from Akmola Region
21st-century Kazakhstani women